Burnham Thorpe is a hamlet and civil parish on the River Burn and near the coast of Norfolk, England. It is famous for being the birthplace of Vice Admiral Horatio Nelson, victor at the Battle of Trafalgar and one of Britain's greatest heroes. At the time of his birth, Nelson's father, Edmund Nelson, was rector of the church in Burnham Thorpe.

The house in which Nelson was born was demolished soon after his father's death, though the rectory that replaced it and the church at which his father preached can still be seen. The site of the former rectory is marked by a roadside plaque.

The villages name means 'Homestead/village on the River Burn' or perhaps, 'hemmed-in land on the River Burn'. 'Thorpe', meaning 'Outlying farm/settlement' was added  to distinguish it from the other Burnhams in Norfolk.

The village's main public house was built in 1637 and was known as The Plough until 1798 when it was renamed The Lord Nelson in honour of the victory at the Battle of the Nile. Nelson held a dinner here for the men of the village prior to his departure to join . The pub survives to this day.

Burnhamthorpe Road in Toronto and Mississauga, Ontario, Canada was named after this settlement.

Famous people from or associated with Burnham Thorpe
Sir William Calthorpe (1410- 1494), High Sheriff of Norfolk and Suffolk
Horatio Nelson, naval commander
Miranda Raison, actress
Lord Zuckerman, scientist and civil servant

See also
The Norfolk Burnhams
Burnhamthorpe Road

References

http://kepn.nottingham.ac.uk/map/place/Norfolk/Burnham%20Thorpe

External links

Villages in Norfolk
King's Lynn and West Norfolk
Civil parishes in Norfolk